The following list includes notable people who were born or have lived in Portland, Maine.

Authors and academics 

 John Howard Appleton, chemist
 Louisa Dow Benton, linguist and letter writer
 Hannah Johnson Carter, art educator
 Elisabeth Cavazza (1849–1926), author, journalist, and music critic
 Jennie Maria Drinkwater Conklin (1841–1900), author
 Leo Connellan, Beat poet and Poet Laureate of Connecticut
 Owen Davis, dramatist
 Robert F. Griffin, essayist
 Dorothy M. Healy, Professor at Westbrook College and Curator of the Maine Women Writers Collection
 Stephen King, author
 Henry Wadsworth Longfellow, poet
 John Neal, author and critic
 Alan Taylor, historian
 William Irwin Thompson, poet and cultural historian

Business 

 James Phinney Baxter, canning magnate and Mayor
 Asa Clapp, international merchant
 Cyrus Curtis, publisher and philanthropist
 John A. Poor, railroad developer
 Roxanne Quimby, founder of Burt's Bees
 Thomas A. Sanders, real estate developer and politician
 Donald Valle, founder and owner of the Valle's Steak House restaurant chain

Explorers and settlers 

 George Baker Leavitt, Sr., whaling captain, arctic explorer
 Capt. Christopher Levett, English explorer of Casco Bay, founded first settlement
 Francis Pettygrove, one of Portland Oregon's founders

Media and arts 

 Dorothy Appleby, American film actress
 Maria a'Becket, painter
 Hiram Abrams, motion picture mogul
 Bebe Buell, model, musician, and mother of Liv Tyler
 Howie Carr, radio personality
 Cody Christian, actor and rapper
 John Greenleaf Cloudman, artist, portrait painter and cabinet maker
 Charles Codman, painter
 Jerry Crasnick, sports journalist
 Kevin Eastman, co-creator of Teenage Mutant Ninja Turtles.
 Greg Finley II, actor
 Frank Fixaris, sportscaster
 Francis Ford, actor
 John Ford, director
 Charles L. Fox, painter, labor unionist, and two-time candidate for Governor of Maine with the Socialist Party
 Adam Gardner, musician
 Peter Garland, composer
 Jeremiah Hacker, journalist and reformer
 Will Holt, songwriter
 Avery Yale Kamila, journalist and community organizer
 Anna Kendrick, actress
 Charles F. Kimball, artist
 Jennie Kimball, actor, soubrette, theatrical manager
 Linda Lavin, actress
 Tawny Little, television newscaster and Miss America (1976)
 Bob Ludwig, Grammy Award-winning audio mastering engineer
 Bob Marley, comedian
 Andrea Martin, actress
 Judd Nelson, actor
 Lincoln Peirce, comic strip creator, Big Nate
 Ryan Peters, aka Spose, rapper
 Victoria Rowell, actress
 Ethelynde Smith, concert singer and botanical painter
 Stuart Saunders Smith, composer and percussionist
 Brett Somers, actress
 Franklin Stanwood, painter
 Phyllis Thaxter, actress
 Liv Tyler, actress
 Louise Brown Verrill, composer

Military 

 James Alden, Jr., rear admiral in the United States Navy
 George G. Gatley, brigadier general who commanded brigades and divisions in World War I
 John H. Hall, inventor of the first United States Army breech-loading rifle
 Charles J. Loring, Jr., Medal of Honor recipient
 Holman S. Melcher, mayor, Civil War veteran
 Edward Preble, naval officer
 Herbert E. Schonland, Medal of Honor recipient
 Ronald Speirs, army officer with the Easy Company, 506 Parachute Infantry Regiment
 Peleg Wadsworth, Revolutionary War general

Politics 

 Joseph Adams, state legislator 
 Justin Alfond, President of the Maine Senate
 George H. Allan, state legislator and women's suffrage proponent
 Daniel W. Ames, Civil War veteran and state legislator
 James Appleton, state legislator and activist
 Joseph E. Brennan, 70th Governor of Maine
 Michael F. Brennan, Mayor and state legislator
 Joshua Chamberlain, Civil War veteran, governor, served as Surveyor of the Portland Port
 Winfred Thaxter Denison, United States Assistant Attorney General and Secretary of the Interior for the Philippines; born in Portland
 Santo DiPietro, Maine state legislator and businessman; born in Portland
 Neal Dow, mayor of Portland; Civil War general; temperance movement leader
 John Eder, state legislator and Maine Green Independent Party organizer
 William P. Fessenden, U.S. Senator
 Fletcher Hale, U.S. Congressman from New Hampshire
 Charles Harlow, mayor of Portland; state legislator
 Anne Haskell, state legislator
 Jon Hinck, state legislator and attorney
 John Lynch, U.S. Congressman
 George Mitchell, U.S. Senate Majority Leader (1989 to 1995); chairman of Walt Disney; U.S. special envoy to the Middle East
 Merle Nelson, state legislator
 William Pitt Preble, Justice of the Maine Supreme Court; U.S. Minister to the Netherlands; President of the St. Lawrence and Atlantic Railroad
 Anne Rand, state legislator
 Thomas Brackett Reed, U.S. Congressman; Speaker of the U.S. House of Representatives
 George Ruby, Black Republican legislator in Reconstruction-era Texas; raised in Portland 
 Charles W. Walton, U.S. Congressman
 Herman W. Waterman, politician from Wisconsin

Professionals 

 Edville Gerhardt Abbott, surgeon
 Oscar Cox, lawyer
 Alexander Wadsworth Longfellow, Jr., architect
 Robert E. McAfee, physician
 Alexander Parris, architect
 Lois Rice, College Board executive & education scholar
 Thomas J. Sparrow, architect
 Henry Aiken Worcester, 19th century minister & vegetarian

Sports 

 Mike Brown (born 1975), mixed martial arts fighter
 Nik Caner-Medley (born 1983), basketball forward 
 Dick Capp (born 1942), American football tight end and linebacker
 Ian Crocker (born 1982), Olympic swimmer
 Rob Elowitch (born 1943), wrestler
 Terry Farnsworth (born 1942), Canadian Olympic judoka
 Ryan Flaherty (born 1986), baseball second baseman
 Charlie Furbush (born 1986), baseball pitcher 
 Rip Jordan (1889–1960), baseball pitcher
 Pete Ladd (born 1956), baseball pitcher
 Gary McAdam (born 1955), ice hockey forward 
 Quinton Porter (born 1982), American football quarterback
 Joan Benoit Samuelson (born 1957), marathon runner
 Bob Stanley (born 1954), baseball pitcher
 Coley Welch (1919–2000), middleweight boxer

Other 

 Cornelia M. Dow (1842–1905), philanthropist, temperance activist
 Nathaniel Gordon, only American slave trader to be tried, convicted, and executed under the Piracy Law of 1820 "for being engaged in the Slave Trade"
 Ellen Martin Henrotin, social reformer, born in Portland, Maine
 Lois Galgay Reckitt (born 1944), executive director of Family Crisis Services, Portland, Maine

References

Portland
People